Frances Black (born 25 June 1960) is an Irish singer and politician. She came to prominence in the late  1980s when she began to play with her family's band, the Black Family, performing a mix of traditional and contemporary Irish music.

Black was elected to Seanad Éireann as an independent senator in 2016 for the Industrial and Commercial Panel.

Background
Black was born in Charlemont Street, Dublin in 1960 into a musical family. She was educated at St Louis High School, Rathmines.  Her father Kevin was a keen fiddle player and mandolinist, a plasterer by trade and a native of Rathlin Island, County Antrim. Her mother Patty (from Dublin) used to sing in local dancehalls. She is the youngest of five children, having three brothers Shay, Michael and Martin, and one sister, Mary Black, who is also a well-known singer.

Musical career

Pre-solo
Black's musical career began at 17, when she began singing with her siblings, in her family group, known as the Black Family. She gained confidence in her singing abilities and enhanced her performing skills through joining the band Arcady in 1988 (with former De Dannan member Johnny McDonagh, Brendan Larrissey, Patsy Broderick, Seán Keane, Cathal Hayden, Sharon Shannon, and Paul Doyle).  The group toured in Europe, Iraq and the United States. They recorded their debut album, After the Ball, containing a mixture of traditional tunes and vocals/songs. The single for the album's title track, the song "After the Ball", which featured Black on lead vocals, performed well in the Irish charts and also made an impact on the American folk market. Due to her young family, the gruelling touring schedule was too much for Black, so she decided to leave the group. Her last tour with the group was in the US in August 1992.

Black teamed up with the Newry singer Kieran Goss, and the pair recorded the album Frances Black and Kieran Goss in 1992. One of the songs on the album, "Wall of Tears", was featured on the compilation album A Woman's Heart. The album went on to become the biggest-selling Irish album ever, and this, along with the subsequent tour, advanced Black's career in the music industry. Other artists on A Woman's Heart included Eleanor McEvoy, Sharon Shannon, Maura O'Connell, Dolores Keane, and her sister Mary Black, who had achieved international success by then.

Solo career

Black received rave reviews while on tour in Australia and New Zealand in March 1993 with 20 other Irish artists, in a Guinness celebration of Irish music. This resulted in a record deal from the Irish label Dara Records. She released her first solo album in 1994, Talk to Me. It became an instant hit, selling over 100,000 copies and spending eight weeks at number one in her native Ireland. The album contained four Nanci Griffith songs (which were unrecorded by Nanci at the time of the release), one Vince Gill song and John Lennon's "Intuition". However, it was her cover of the Christie Hennessy song, "All the Lies That You Told Me", that received the most attention and it signalled the arrival of Black as a major new talent. Talk to Me was released in the UK and United States also, where she toured in 1994.

In March 1995, Black's second solo also, The Sky Road, was released in Ireland, UK and United States. She was the recipient of the 'Best Album by a Female' award, by the IRMA. Due to her rising popularity in America, she embarked on her second solo tour there in 1995. Among Ms. Black's most successful singles are re-recordings of Acker Bilk's "Stranger on the Shore" in 1996 and in 1997, the Yvonne Elliman-popularized tune "Love Me, Please".  1997 saw the release of Black's album The Smile on Your Face. It contained songs written by numerous Irish, English and American songwriters. The follow-up album was 1998's Don't Get Me Wrong, which was released in the UK under Sony Records and was her fourth solo effort. It once again cemented Ms. Black's reputation as an international performer, becoming as revered as her older sister Mary.

2001 brought the release of a compilation, The Best of Frances Black, on Dara-Dolphin Records. The album included 16 tracks from her recordings with Arcady and The Black Family, as well as her solo recordings. Her two most recent albums How High the Moon (2003) and This Love Will Carry (2006) have also sold well in Ireland and Black toured the United States in support of the recordings. Her latest compilation, The Essential Frances Black (2008), went platinum and contained 40 of her most popular songs.

Political career 
Black was elected to Seanad Éireann as a Senator on her first attempt at a political campaign in 2016, as an independent candidate. She received her nomination from the Independent Broadcasters of Ireland and ran on the Industrial and Commercial Panel. She is a member of the Civil Engagement group in the 25th Seanad.

She has called for alcohol not to be sold next to nappies in supermarkets.

Black tabled a private member's bill in January 2018 which she described as seeking "to prohibit the import and sales of goods, services and natural resources originating in illegal settlements in occupied territories".

In April 2018, NBC's Vivian Salama, on behalf of the politician George Mitchell, personally presented the Arab American Institute Foundation (AAIF)'s Award for Individual Achievement to Black at the 20th annual Kahlil Gibran Spirit of Humanity Awards in Washington. Mitchell made a special video message in praise of Black. The award was in recognition of her work as founder of RISE Foundation and her "tireless efforts on behalf of those struggling with addiction and their families". She was re-elected at the 2020 Seanad election.

Personal life
Black had her first child, Eoghan, when she was 19, and her second child Aoife, when she was 21. Her first marriage ended shortly afterwards, and she is now married to her second husband, Brian Allen. Her daughter Aoife Scott recorded a track on Black's album This Love Will Carry. Aoife is now also a well known singer and songwriter herself in Ireland after releasing her first solo album Carry the Day. Her son Eoghan is also a well known musician, songwriter and producer in the Irish music scene and is currently completing a degree in psychology in DCU.

Black returned to college as a mature student in 2004 and qualified as an addiction counsellor, and did some counselling work at the Rutland Addiction Treatment Centre in Dublin. She established a charity called the Rise Foundation in 2009 which supports family members who have a loved one with an alcohol, drug or gambling problem. Rise runs a number of 10-week family programmes around the country and a one-to-one counselling service for family members who are suffering from stress and anxiety living with a loved one with an addiction problem.

Discography
Frances Black and Kieran Goss (1992)
Talk to Me (1994)
The Sky Road (1995)
The Smile on Your Face (1996)
Don't Get Me Wrong (1998)
The Best of Frances Black (2000)
How High the Moon (2003)
This Love Will Carry (2006)
The Essential Frances Black (2008)
Stronger  (2013)

References

External links
  (music)
  (politics)

1960 births
Living people
Irish women singers
Members of the 25th Seanad
Members of the 26th Seanad
21st-century women members of Seanad Éireann
Musicians from Dublin (city)
Independent members of Seanad Éireann
Transatlantic Records artists
20th-century Irish women musicians
20th-century Irish musicians
21st-century Irish women musicians
21st-century Irish musicians
People from Portobello, Dublin